Andrew William Dunn, is a British cinematographer. He received the British Academy of Film and Television Arts best cameraman award three times in the 1980s.

Andrew Dunn was born in London, England. He started making films in his early teens and joined the BBC as a film editor, but continued to develop and shoot his personal projects. Dunn's first film credit was in 1981 for cinematography on the BBC film Andrina.

Dunn has served as Director of Photography on a wide variety of films, including L.A. Story, The Madness of King George, Gosford Park, The History Boys, Life as We Know It, Crazy, Stupid, Love, Summer in February, The Butler, Hello Carter, and Endless Love, amongst many others.

Filmography

Feature films

Television

TV films

Awards
1985 	British Academy of Film and Television Arts  TV Award - Best Film Cameraman for: Threads (1984)
1986 British Academy of Film and Television Arts TV Award - Best Film Cameraman for: Edge of Darkness (1985)
1989 British Academy of Film and Television Arts TV Award - Best Film Cameraman for: Tumbledown (1988)
1995 	British Society of Cinematographers - Best Cinematography Award for: The Madness of King George (1994)
1996 	Evening Standard British Film Award - Best Technical/Artistic Achievement for: The Madness of King George (1994)

Further reading
 (2006) "Andrew Dunn" Contemporary Theatre, Film, and Television: A biographical guide featuring performers, directors, writers, producers, designers, managers, choreographers, technicians, composers, executives, dancers, and critics in the United States, Canada, Great Britain and the world Vol. 65, Thomson Gale, Detroit,

References

External links

English cinematographers
Living people
Place of birth missing (living people)
1950 births